Two elections were scheduled in Thailand in 2006 for the lower house of the Thai National Assembly, the House of Representatives:

 April 2006 Thai legislative election and
 October 2006 Thai legislative election